Ralph van Raat (born 1978) is a Dutch classical pianist.

Biography and career 
Pianist and musicologist Ralph van Raat appears as a recitalist in Europe, Asia, Australia and the United States. Augmenting traditional repertoire, he takes special interest in the performance of contemporary classical music. He has worked closely with many composers on the interpretation of their piano works, with John Adams, Louis Andriessen, Tan Dun, György Kurtág, Magnus Lindberg, Arvo Pärt, Frederic Rzewski and Sir John Tavener. Many composers have dedicated their piano compositions to van Raat.

Ralph van Raat performs regularly as a soloist with orchestras including London Sinfonietta, the BBC Symphony Orchestra, the Shanghai Philharmonic, the Royal Concertgebouw Orchestra, the Rotterdam Philharmonic Orchestra, the Los Angeles Philharmonic, Melbourne Symphony Orchestra, Guangzhou Symphony Orchestra and the Dortmunder Philharmoniker. He has worked closely with conductors including Tan Dun, Valery Gergiev, JoAnn Falletta, David Robertson, Yannick Nézet-Séguin, Susanna Mälkki, Stefan Asbury and John Adams.

He has performed as a soloist at important festivals including the Gergiev Festival, the BBC Proms, the Festival International de Musique de Besançon, Holland Festival, the Time of Music festival in Viitasaari, Finland, Huddersfield Contemporary Music Festival in the UK, the Berliner Festspiele, the Hong Kong Festival of the Arts and Tanglewood Summer Festival in the United States. He has been given his own concert series at both the Concertgebouw and Muziekgebouw of Amsterdam, and Rotterdam’s De Doelen.

In 2018, Van Raat performed his début at both New York’s Carnegie Hall and the Philharmonie in Paris, both to sold out halls, standing ovations and rave reviews.

Since 2006, Van Raat has had an exclusive contract with Naxos. His first recording for Naxos (the complete piano works by John Adams) received top ratings in several magazines. Van Raat’s recording of Arvo Pärt’s piano repertoire received a 5/5star rating in BBC Music. Naxos honoured him in 2009 with an Artist’s Box and in 2017 with an Artist’s Profile.

In addition to winning First Prize at the International Gaudeamus Interpreters Competition in 1999, Van Raat has won a large number of prizes and awards, including an international Borletti-Buitoni Fellowship, the Philip Morris Arts Award, the Stipend-Prize during the “Internationale Ferienkurse fur Neue Musik” in Darmstadt, the Second Prize as well as the Donemus-Prize (for Contemporary Music) of the Princess Christina Competition, the Elisabeth Everts Prize, the VSCD Classical Music Prize, the Fortis MeesPierson Award of the Amsterdam Concertgebouw, and the Prijs Klassiek (Classics Prize) of the Dutch public broadcaster, NTR. In 2019, he was awarded the VSCD Ovation Prize for a hugely successful concert program featuring works by legendary Dutch composer Louis Andriessen (including a new work dedicated to Van Raat) and the exceedingly difficult solo version of Igor Stravinsky's Sacre du Printemps in the composer approved version by Vladimir Leyetchkiss.

Ralph van Raat graduated with honors from both the Conservatory and the University of Amsterdam (musicology). He teaches contemporary piano interpretation at his Alma mater and regularly gives masterclasses and lectures at several European conservatories and for many foundations and universities. Van Raat is a Jury member of the Orléans Concours International. 
  
Ralph van Raat is a Steinway Artist.
www.ralphvanraat.com

References

External links
 Ralph van Raat's web site
 Ralph van Raat discography at Naxos Records

1978 births
Living people
Dutch classical pianists
Conservatorium van Amsterdam alumni
University of Amsterdam alumni
Recipients of the Gaudeamus International Interpreters Award
21st-century classical pianists